Stone is an unincorporated community in Granite County, Montana, United States, located 11.9 miles south of Drummond and 12.43 mi north of Phillipsburg on the Pintler Veterans Memorial Scenic Highway. Stone is served by the post office in Hall.

Resources 

 Stone on Google Maps

Unincorporated communities in Granite County, Montana